Nico Neidhart (born 27 September 1994) is a German professional footballer who plays for Hansa Rostock as a full back. He is the son of football manager Christian Neidhart.

Neidhart made his debut for VfL Osnabrück in August 2012, as a substitute for Marcus Piossek in a 3–0 away defeat to Stuttgarter Kickers.

References

External links

1994 births
Living people
People from Flensburg
German footballers
Footballers from Schleswig-Holstein
Association football midfielders
VfB Oldenburg players
VfL Osnabrück players
FC Schalke 04 II players
Sportfreunde Lotte players
FC Emmen players
FC Hansa Rostock players
3. Liga players
Eredivisie players